Carpella is a genus of moths in the family Geometridae.

Species
 Carpella aequidistans Thierry-Mieg, 1893
 Carpella districta Walker, [1865]
 Carpella innotata Warren, 1894
 Carpella semigrisea (Thierry-Mieg, 1892)

References
 Carpella at Markku Savela's Lepidoptera and Some Other Life Forms
 Natural History Museum Lepidoptera genus database

Ennominae
Geometridae genera